Gerard Stigter (6 November 1936 – 12 August 2021), known by the pseudonym K. Schippers, was a Dutch poet, prose writer and art critic. Credited with having introduced the readymade as a poetic form, the whole of his work is dedicated to looking at everyday objects and events in a new way.

Career
Schippers was born in Amsterdam. Together with J. Bernlef and other friends, he founded the Neo-Dadaist magazine Barbarber (1958–71). In the years that followed the launch he co-operated with Bernlef in editing selections from the magazine and, in Een cheque voor de tandarts (A cheque for the dentist, 1967), in commenting on the ancestry of its literary stance. Another binding link with Bernlef is the fact that in 1960 they married twin sisters, the daughters of the Dutch poet Ed. Hoornik (1910–70).

As an art critic, Schippers also authored studies of the history of Dada in the Netherlands (Holland Dada, 1974) and of the bride theme in the work of  Marcel Duchamp (De bruid van Marcel Duchamp, 2010), as well as writing his own text inspired by the work of Man Ray (Het formaat van Man Ray, 1979) and editing the experimental poems of Theo van Doesburg (Nieuwe woordbeeldingen. Verzamelde gedichten van I.K. Bonset, 1975).

Among the literary awards Schippers garnered was the 1966 Amsterdam Municipal poetry prize for his second collection of poetry, Een klok en profil; the 1983 Multatuli Prize for his third novel Beweegredenen; the 1995 and 1999 Silver Griffin for his plays for children; and the 1996 P.C. Hooft Award for his work as a whole. After his selected poems of 1980, he published no new collections until 2011. In 2014 his collection Buiten Beeld was chosen as the gift volume to accompany other poetry purchases during National Poetry Week in the Netherlands and Flanders.

Crossing  boundaries
When Schippers helped launch Barbarber, it was called a ‘magazine for texts’ (tijdschrift voor teksten) and was distrustful of the work of the preceding 1950s generation of experimental poets on the grounds that their concern had been more with aesthetics than with the nature of reality, which ought to be the real focus of poetry. The anti-poetic gestures appearing there were inspired by Dada and eventually introduced ‘literary ready-mades’ in order to call into question the boundary between art and reality. One item provided by Schippers was a newspaper item about a lost tortoise. The same iconoclastic attitudes continued into his later work. In Buiten Beeld (Beyond the frame, 2014), for example, bare dots on the two-dimensional page are titled “The position of moles in the sky”, drawing a parallel between a conventional star map and molehills in the earth merely by the suggestiveness of the title alone.

Though much of his later poetic work has an apparent form, it very seldom rhymes or makes use of metaphor and its main purpose is to draw attention to the ordinary and everyday. In “White” Schippers affirms that “white is noticed/ because it’s not alone/ on the paper”. This same approach is confirmed too in Buiten Beeld in the poem “Black”, with its final appeal to a child's vision: ‘Look at [letters]/ like a five-year-old/ who has never/ read a word’. Such a fresh way of looking at ordinary things from unfamiliar angles was suggested by Marcel Duchamp’s saying that ‘when a clock is seen from the side it no longer tells the time’, from which Schippers took the title of his second poetry collection, Een klok en profil (A clock in profile, 1965).
 
 
Eventually he also extended this vision into his novels. Eerste Indrukken (First impressions, 1979) is subtitled ‘the memoirs of a three-year-old’, where nothing unusual happens to the youngster, but it is related from an unusual, fresh perspective. Some poems were recycled into these novels. The sentence “Take a good look around you and you see everything is coloured” in his novel Bewijsmateriaal (Material Evidence, 1978) first appeared as a 4-line poem in his collection Een vis zwemt uit zijn taalgebied (A fish swims out of its meaning area, 1976). The four sentences of De la grammaire anglaise et hollandaise avec un coup de théâtre triste, which are the same in English as in Dutch, are repeated in Zilah (2002). In general, the fantastic situations in these novels flow from a single initial supposition or macguffin. In Zilah (2002) it is the consequences that follow when the heroine buys the rights to the Dutch language as a trademark name; in Waar was je nou (Where were you, 2005), it is the ability to enter a photograph and relive one's own past.
 
In the case of the poem repeated in Bewijsmateriaal, there was another form of recycling when it was put to use by the artist Klaas Gubbels. There the lines accompany one of the artist's typical coffee pots on a Nijmegen house-end. The mural dates from 1991 and was the winner of the Jurylid Chabotprijs. Later the two co-operated in a joint print-poem art publication, De kan (1995).

Prizes
1966 - Poëzieprijs van de gemeente Amsterdam 
1980 - Cestoda-prijs
1983 - Multatuliprijs 
1990 - Jan Greshoffprijs for Museo sentimental
1995 - Zilveren Griffel for 's Nachts op dak
1996 - P.C. Hooft-prijs 
1997 - Pierre Bayle-prijs
1999 - Zilveren Griffel for Sok of sprei
2006 - Libris Literatuur Prijs for Waar was je nou

Bibliography
1963 De waarheid als De Koe (poetry)
1964 Barbarber, tijdschrift voor teksten. Een keuze uit dertig nummers (anthology with J. Bernlef and G. Brands)
1964 Wat zij bedoelen (with J. Bernlef, interviews with the poet Jan Hanlo)
1965 Een klok en profil (poetry)
1967 128 vel schrijfpapier (texts with the poet C. Buddingh') 
1967 Een cheque voor de tandarts (with J. Bernlef) 
1968 Barbarber, een keuze uit tien jaar, 1958-1968 (with J. Bernlef and G. Brands)
1969 Verplaatste tafels, reportages, research, vaudeville (poetry)
1971 - Een avond in Amsterdam, tien gesprekken met Ben ten Holter
1972 Sonatines door het open raam. Gedichten bij partituren van Clementi, Kuhlau en Lichner (poetry)
1974 Holland Dada (art history)
1975 Edits Nieuwe woordbeeldingen. Verzamelde gedichten van I.K. Bonset;; 
1976 Een vis zwemt uit zijn taalgebied. Tekst en beeld voor witte clown (poetry)
1978 Bewijsmateriaal (novel) 
1979 Eerste indrukken. Memoires van een driejarige (novel) 
1979 Het formaat van Man Ray (text)
1980 Een leeuwerik boven een weiland. Een keuze uit de gedichten (selected poems) 
1982 Beweegredenen (novel) 
1985 Een liefde in 1947 (novel) 
1986 De berg en de steenfabriek (essays) 
1989 Een maan van Saturnus. De film te midden van de kunsten (art criticism) 
1989 Het witte schoolbord (long story) 
1989 Museo sentimental (stories and essays) 
1992 Eb (essays) 
1993 Vluchtig eigendom (novel) 
1994  's Nachts op dak (children’s theatre) 
1995 De vermiste kindertekening (stories and essays) 
1995 De kan (6 poems accompanied by Klaas Gubbels’ coffee pot prints)  
1996 Poeder en wind (novel) 
1997 Henri Plaat presents... (with Betty van Garrel) 
1998 Sok of sprei (children’s drama) 
1998 Sprenkelingen (stories and essays) 
2002 Zilah (novel) 
2005 Waar was je nou (novel)  
2005 Het droomhuis (children’s fiction, translated by Andrew May as The Dreamhouse)  
2008 De Hoedenwinkel (novel) 
2010 De bruid van Marcel Duchamp (art study) ; (French translation as La Mariée de Marcel Duchamp by Camille Richert and Judith Wambacq, 2021) 
2010 Op een dag (short story)
2011 Tellen en wegen (poetry) 
2012 Op de foto (novel) 
2013 Voor jou (short story) 
2014 Fijn dat u luistert (poetry) 
2014 Buiten Beeld (Dutch Poetry Week gift collection)
2015 Niet verder vertellen (novel), 

References
 Bertram Mourits, “The conceptual poetic of K. Schippers”, Dutch Crossing'' 21.1, 1997, pp. 119–34. This is a primary source for the section on Schippers' writing.

External links
 27 poems in translation, including ten from Buiten Beeld (Off-screen, 2014)

1936 births
2021 deaths
Writers from Amsterdam
Dutch male novelists
20th-century Dutch novelists
21st-century Dutch novelists
Dutch male poets
20th-century Dutch poets
P. C. Hooft Award winners
20th-century Dutch male writers
21st-century Dutch male writers